The Great Love can refer to the following films:

 The Great Love (1918 film), an American silent film starring Lillian Gish
 The Great Love (1925 film), an American silent film starring Zazu Pitts
 The Great Love (1931 film), an Austrian film directed by Otto Preminger
 The Great Love (1938 film), a Swedish comedy film starring Tutta Rolf
 The Great Love (1942 film), a German film starring Zarah Leander 
 The Great Love (1969 film), a French film